KERA (90.1 MHz) is a National Public Radio member FM station serving North Texas. KERA also relays its programming to three separate FM relay translators, extending the coverage area of KERA's programming into the Sherman-Denison area, Wichita Falls, and Tyler.

Transmitter/Translators

KERA is based in Dallas, and the station's main transmitter is located in Cedar Hill, Texas with translators that serve Tyler (K261CW, 100.1 FM), the Sherman/Denison area (K257EV, 99.3 FM), and Wichita Falls (K202DR, 88.3 FM). It was also rebroadcast on the Public, educational, and government access (PEG) cable tv channel, Irving Community Television Network during its off-air times prior to 2009.

Programming
KERA FM has a news and information format that includes national programs, reports and specials from the KERA newsroom and other original productions. CEO also has a television version that broadcasts on KERA-TV.KERA FM's on-air staff includes Morning Edition host Sam Baker, All Things Considered host Justin Martin, and reporters Stella Chavez, Christopher Connelly, Lauren Silverman, Jerome Weeks and Bill Zeeble.

NPR 
KERA is an NPR member station and carries NPR programming.

KERA News

Signature series 
KERA News Digital Storytelling projects provide an in-depth look at the people of Texas — the crises they endure, the issues they overcome and the triumphs they achieve.

Think 
The KERA production Think, hosted by Krys Boyd, features guests, often authors or speechmakers, who discuss intellectual or intriguing topics with Ms. Boyd, usually supplemented by call-in comments and questions. The show's host and crew have traveled to Washington, D.C., yearly since 2015 to broadcast live from NPR headquarters. Notable guests during Think in D.C. have included Michael Eric Dyson and U.S. Senators Ted Cruz and John Cornyn.

As of October 2021, Think is carried live in its midday time slot by 151 radio stations in Texas, Alabama, Alaska, California, Colorado, Florida, Georgia, Illinois, Indiana, Kentucky, Louisiana, Michigan, Mississippi, Missouri, North Carolina, Oregon, Pennsylvania, Rhode Island, South Carolina, Virginia, and Washington State.

History 
KERA FM went on the air in July 1974, serving Dallas, Fort Worth and Denton with a mix of news and music programming. The station has since expanded its broadcast into Wichita Falls (88.3), Tyler (100.1), and Sherman (99.3). KERA FM switched to a news and information format in 2000, with an emphasis on the in-depth news programs and thoughtful conversations that make public radio unique. In 2014, KERA expanded its news department, leading to a surge in local reporting. Since this expansion, hundreds of KERA stories have broadcast nationally and internationally by NPR, PRI and the BBC.Prior to the launch of KXT 91.7 FM, KERA FM aired locally produced music program 90.1 at Night hosted by Paul Slavens, which aired Sunday nights from 8:00pm until 10:00pm. The program was moved to their newly acquired sister station KXT and was renamed The Paul Slavens Show. With that move, KERA FM transitioned to a full-time News/Talk format.

From 2012 until April 2018, KERA has enjoyed a news partnership with NBC-owned television station KXAS-Channel 5 in Fort Worth. This was a part of a larger partnership effort between all of the NBC O&Os and nonprofit news organizations in their communities, a byproduct of the Comcast-NBCUniversal merger which took place in 2011. The content has since then moved to Audacy-owned news station KRLD 1080 AM.

The station's call letters, which are said to represent a "new era in broadcasting," are shared with Dallas public television station KERA-TV channel 13; both are owned by North Texas Public Broadcasting Inc., a non-profit corporation registered in the state of Texas. While there is cross-promotion between stations, each operates its own pledge drives.

Station slogans
Radio Worth Listening To (1990s-2001)
Radio Unlimited (2001–2009)
Go Public. (2016–present)

See also
KKXT (AAA radio station)
KERA TV
WRR (FM)

References

External links
; see also listing with map and translators at Recnet

KERA Radio
Listen to KERA online via Windows Media Audio and MP3 streams.
 DFW Radio Archives
 DFW Radio/TV History

ERA
NPR member stations
Radio stations established in 1973
1973 establishments in Texas